Jim Laughton (born January 18, 1960) is a former American football tight end. He played for the Seattle Seahawks in 1986.

References

1960 births
Living people
American football tight ends
San Diego State Aztecs football players
Seattle Seahawks players